This is a list of stations operated by the Royal Canadian Air Force (RCAF), or stations where RCAF units existed, from 1924 until unification into the Canadian Forces on February 1, 1968.

Some of the RCAF stations listed in this article link to facility descriptions containing the prefix "CFB" (Canadian Forces Base) or "CFS" (Canadian Forces Station). These facilities were at one time RCAF stations, but changed to CFBs or CFSs following unification of the Canadian Armed Forces in 1968.  Most former RCAF stations still in use by the Canadian Forces are still operated by the RCAF (renamed from Air Command or AIRCOM in 2011, from the use "air element" 1968–2011).  During the 1990s, most RCAF squadrons on Canadian Forces Bases were reorganized into "wings" as the primary lodger unit.  Consequently, many Canadian Forces Bases used as air force bases are frequently referred to without the prefix CFB, e.g., "CFB Greenwood" is also referred to as "14 Wing Greenwood", with 14 Wing being the primary lodger unit at CFB Greenwood.

Before 1968, all RCAF facilities followed the naming tradition of the Royal Air Force, whereby the prefix RCAF (vs. RAF) was affixed.

Operating locations (1924–1939)

Primary Canadian stations

Alberta
 High River

British Columbia
 Vancouver

Manitoba
 Winnipeg

Nova Scotia
 Dartmouth

Ontario
 Camp Borden
 Ottawa
Quinte West

Operating locations (1939–1945)

Primary Canadian stations

Alberta

 RCAF Station Bowden
 RCAF Station Calgary
 RCAF Station Claresholm
 RCAF Station De Winton
 RCAF Station Edmonton
 RCAF Detachment Edmonton
 RCAF Station Fort Macleod

 RCAF Station High River
 RCAF Station Lethbridge
 RCAF Detachment Lethbridge
 RCAF Detachment Netook
 RCAF Station Pearce
 RCAF Station Penhold
 RCAF Station Vulcan
 RCAF Station Wainwright

British Columbia

 RCAF Station Abbotsford
 RCAF Station Alliford Bay
 RCAF Station Bella Bella
 RCAF Station Boundary Bay
 RCAF Station Coal Harbour
 RCAF Station Comox
 RCAF Station Dog Creek
 RCAF Station Fort Nelson
 RCAF Station Fort St. John
 RCAF Station Hope
 RCAF Station Holberg
 RCAF Station Jericho Beach
 RCAF Station Midway

 RCAF Station Oliver
 RCAF Station Patricia Bay
 RCAF Station Penticton
 RCAF Station Port Hardy
 RCAF Station Prince George
 RCAF Station Prince Rupert
 RCAF Station Princeton
 RCAF Station Sea Island
 RCAF Station Smithers 
 RCAF Station Terrace
 RCAF Station Tofino
 RCAF Station Quesnel
 RCAF Station Ucluelet

Manitoba

 RCAF Station Brandon
 RCAF Station Carberry
 RCAF Station Dauphin
 RCAF Station Gimli
 RCAF Station Macdonald
 RCAF Station Neepawa

 RCAF Station Paulson
 RCAF Station Portage la Prairie
 RCAF Station Rivers, Canadian Joint Air Training Command (CJATC) New Sarum
 RCAF Station Souris
 RCAF Station Virden
 RCAF Station Winnipeg
 RCAF Detachment Winnipeg

New Brunswick

 RCAF Station Chatham
 RCAF Station Moncton

 RCAF Station Pennfield Ridge
 RCAF Station Saint John
 RCAF Station Scoudoc

Nova Scotia

 RCAF Station Dartmouth
 RCAF Station Debert
 RCAF Station Greenwood
 RCAF Station Halifax
 RCAF Station Maitland
 RCAF Aerodrome New Glasgow & Trenton

 RCAF Station Stanley
 RCAF Station Shelburne
 RCAF Station Sydney
 RCAF Station Yarmouth
 Sydney River Base (Sydney River, Nova Scotia)
 Kelly Beach (North Sydney, Nova Scotia)

Ontario

 RCAF Detachment Alliston
 RCAF Detachment Armstrong Station
 RCAF Station Aylmer
 RCAF Station Arnprior
 RCAF Station Belleville
 RCAF Station Brantford
 RCAF Station Camp Borden
 RCAF Detachment Cayuga
 RCAF Station Centralia
 RCAF Station Clinton
 RCAF Station Crumlin
 RCAF Station Deseronto
 RCAF Station Dunnville
 RCAF Detachment Edenvale
 RCAF Station Edgar
 RCAF Station Fingal
 RCAF Station Guelph
 RCAF Station Hagersville

 RCAF Station Hamilton
 RCAF Station Jarvis
 RCAF Detachment Kapuskasing
 RCAF Station Kingston
 RCAF Station Leaside
 RCAF Station London
 RCAF Detachment Malton
 RCAF Station Mountain View
 RCAF Station North Bay
 RCAF Station Oshawa
 RCAF Station Pendleton
 RCAF Station Picton
 RCAF Station Port Albert
 RCAF Station Rockcliffe
 RCAF Station Trenton
 RCAF Station Uplands
 RCAF Detachment Welland

Prince Edward Island

 RCAF Station Charlottetown
 RCAF Station Mount Pleasant

 RCAF Station Summerside

Quebec

 RCAF Station Bagotville
 RCAF Station Parent
 RCAF Station Gaspé
 RCAF Station Lachine
 RCAF Station Mont-Joli
 RCAF Station Montreal

 RCAF Station Sept-Îles
 RCAF Station St Hubert
 RCAF Station St Jean
 RCAF Station Victoriaville
 RCAF Detachment Montreal
 RCAF Detachment Megantic

Saskatchewan

 RCAF Station Assiniboia
 RCAF Station Caron
 RCAF Station Dafoe
 RCAF Station Davidson
 RCAF Station Estevan
 RCAF Station Moose Jaw
 RCAF Station Mossbank

 RCAF Station North Battleford
 RCAF Station Prince Albert
 RCAF Station Regina
 RCAF Station Saskatoon
 RCAF Station Swift Current
 RCAF Station Yorkton
 RCAF Station Weyburn

Non-Canadian North American operating locations

Alaska

 Annette Island Army Airfield
 Fort Glenn Army Airfield (Umnak)
 Kiska Army Airfield
 Elmendorf Army Airfield (Anchorage)

 Marks Air Force Base (Nome)
 Miller Army Airfield
 Naval Air Station Adak
 Naval Air Station Kodiak

Bermuda
 Hamilton

Newfoundland
 RCAF Station Gander

United Kingdom operating locations

England

 RAF Acklington
 RAF Andover
 RAF Ashford
 RAF Baginton
 RAF Balderton
 RAF Bassingbourn
 RAF Beaulieu
 RAF Biggin Hill
 RAF Bircham Newton
 RAF Blakehill Farm
 RAF Bradwell Bay
 RAF Burn
 RAF Castle Camps
 RAF Catterick
 RAF Charmy Down
 RAF Chivenor
 RAF Coleby Grange
 RAF Colerne
 RAF Croft
 RAF Croydon
 RAF Dalton
 RAF Davidstow Moor
 RAF Debden
 RAF Digby
 RAF Dishforth
 RAF Docking
 RAF Down Ampney
 RAF Driffield
 RAF Dunsfold 
 RAF East Moor
 RAF Eastchurch
 RAF Exeter
 RAF Ford
 RAF Friston
 RAF Funtington
 RAF Gatwick
 RAF Gransden Lodge
 RAF Gravesend
 RAF Hartford Bridge
 RAF Harrowbeer
 RAF Halton
 RAF Hawkinge
 RAF Headcorn
 RAF High Post
 RAF Holmsley South
 RAF Hornchurch
 RAF Horne
 RAF Hunsdon

 RAF Hurn/Bournemouth
 RAF Kenley
 RAF Lashenden
 RAF Leeming
 RAF Lindholme
 RAF Linton-on-Ouse
 RAF Lympne
 RAF Manston
 RAF Martlesham Heath
 RAF Merston
 RAF Middle Wallop
 RAF Middleton St. George
 RAF Mildenhall
 RAF Molesworth 
 RAF North Coates
 RAF North Luffenham
 RAF North Weald
 RAF Odiham
 RAF Old Sarum
 RAF Penshurst
 RAF Perranporth
 RAF Pocklington
 RAF Portreath
 RAF Predannack
 RAF Redhill
 RAF Scorton
 RAF Skipton-on-Swale
 RAF Southend
 RAF St Eval
 RAF Staplehurst
 RAF Strubby
 RAF Syerston
 RAF Tangmere
 RAF Topcliffe
 RAF Tempsford
 RAF Ternhill
 RAF Tholthorpe
 RAF Thorney Island
 RAF Trebulzue
 RAF Waddington
 RAF Warmwood
 RAF Wellingore
 RAF West Malling
 RAF Westhampnett
 RAF Weston Zoyland
 RAF Winkleigh
 RAF Wittering
 RAF Wombleton
 RAF Woodchurch
 RAF Zeals

Northern Ireland

 RAF Castle Archdale

 RAF Limavady

Scotland

 RAF Ayr
 RAF Banff
 RAF Castletown
 RAF Dallachy
 RAF Dundonald
 RAF Dyce
 RAF Leuchars
 RAF Oban

 RAF Peterhead
 RAF Prestwick
 RAF Skeabrae
 RAF Skitten
 RAF Stranraer
 RAF Sullom Voe
 RAF Sumburgh
 RAF Tain
 RAF Wick

Wales

 RAF Angle
 RAF Fairwood Common

 RAF Valley
 RAF Pembroke Dock

Northern Europe operating locations

Belgium

 Base 90 Kleine-Brogel
 Base 56 Evere
 Base 58 Melsbroek
 Base 64 Diest

 Base 66 Blankenburg
 Base 68 Le Culot
 Base 70 Antwerp 
 Base 71 Koksijde
 Base 75 Nivelles

Denmark
 Base 160 Copenhagen

France

 ALG (Advanced Landing Ground) Wormhout
 Base 2 Bazenville
 Base 3 Ste Croix-sur-Mer
 Base 4 Beny-sur-Mer
 Base 8 Sommervieu
 Base 9 Lantheuil
 Base 11 Longues
 Base 17 Carpiquet
 Base 18 Cristot
 Base 19 Lingevres

 Base 21 Ste-Honorine-de-Ducy
 Base 24 St Andre
 Base 25 Illiers l'Eveque
 Base 28 Evreux
 Base 34 Avrilly
 Base 40 Beauvais
 Base 44 Poix
 Base 48 Glisy
 Base 51 Vendeville
 Base 52 Douai

Germany

 Base 100 Goch
 Base 108 Rheine
 Base 110 Osnabruck
 Base 114 Diepholz
 Base 116 Wunstorf
 Base 118 Celle

 Base 150 Hustedt
 Base 152 Fassberg
 Base 154 Soltau
 Base 156 Luneburg
 Base 166 Flensburg
 Base 174 Uetersen
 Base Y-75 Frankfurt

Iceland
 Reykjavík

The Netherlands

 ALG Arnhem
 ALG Breda
 ALG Nijmegen
 ALG Tilburg 
 Base 77 Gilze-Rijen
 Base 78 Eindhoven

 Base 80 Volkel
 Base 82 Grave
 Base 84 Rips
 Base 88 Heesch
 Base 106 Twente
 'JOE' Airfield (Apeldoorn)

Norway
 Oslo, Norway

Southern Europe and Mediterranean Sea operating locations

 Gibraltar

 Luga, Malta

Italy

 Bellaria
 Canne
 Cassibile
 Fano
 Fabrica
 Foggia
 Gioia del Colle
 Grottaglie

 India Anzio
 Lentini West
 Littorio, Rome, Italy
 Loreto
 Perugia
 Treviso
 Triolo
 Tulihal
 Venafro

North Africa

 Devesoir, Egypt
 Kafareet, Egypt
 Idku, Egypt
 Shandur, Egypt
 Mellaha, Libya
 Tripoli

 Rabat-Sale, Morocco
 Ben Gardane, Tunisia
 Goubrine South, Tunisia
 Hani East Landing Ground, Tunisia
 Kairouan/Zina, Tunisia
 Kairouan/Pavilllier, Tunisia

Other operating locations

Indian Ocean

 Kinmagan, Burma
 Kyaukpyu, Burma
 Mawnubyin, Burma

 Koggala, Ceylon
 Gujrat, India
 Kanglatongbi, India
 Addu Atoll, Seychelles Islands

Persian Gulf
 Bahrain

Africa

 Langebaan, South Africa

 Mombasa, Kenya

Operating locations (1946–1968)

Primary Canadian stations

Alberta

 RCAF Station Cold Lake
 RCAF Station Penhold

 RCAF Station Edmonton

British Columbia
 RCAF Station Comox
 RCAF Station Holberg
 RCAF Station Sea Island

Manitoba

 RCAF Station Portage la Prairie

 RCAF Station Winnipeg

New Brunswick
 RCAF Station Chatham

Newfoundland

 RCAF Station Gander

 RCAF Station Goose Bay

Nova Scotia

 RCAF Station Greenwood

 RCAF Station Shearwater

Ontario

 RCAF Station Borden
 RCAF Station North Bay
 RCAF Station Trenton

 RCAF Station Uplands
 RCAF Station Rockcliffe
 RCAF Station Downsview

Prince Edward Island
 RCAF Station Summerside

Quebec

 RCAF Station Bagotville

 RCAF Station St Hubert

 RCAF Station Parent
 RCAF Station Senneterre
 RCAF Station Lac St Denis
 RCAF Station Lamacaza
RCAF Station Val d'Or

Saskatchewan
 RCAF Station Moose Jaw

Auxiliary Canadian stations

Alberta
 RCAF Station Namao

Manitoba

 RCAF Station Rivers Canadian Joint Air Training Command (CJATC) New Sarum

 RCAF Station Gimli

Newfoundland
 RCAF Station Torbay

Northwest Territories
 RCAF Station Resolute Bay

Nova Scotia
 RCAF Station Debert

Ontario

 RCAF Station Clinton

 RCAF Station Centralia

Quebec

 RCAF Station Dorval
 RCAF Station La Macaza

 RCAF Station Val d'Or

Yukon
 RCAF Station Whitehorse

Emergency Canadian airfields

British Columbia

 Port Hardy
 Puntzi Mountain

 Tofino

Ontario

 Earlton
 RCAF Detachment Grand Bend
 Gore Bay
 Killaloe

 Muskoka
 Sudbury
 Timmins
 Wiarton

Quebec

 Casey
 Lac-des-Loups
 L'Ancienne-Lorette

 La Tuque
 RCAF Station Mont-Joli
 Val-d'Or

DEW Line radar stations
This covers 1946–1968. Nunavut was created in 1999. Stations are listed from west to east.

Yukon

 Komakuk Beach
 Stokes Point

 Shingle Point

Northwest Territories

 Tununuk Camp
 Tuktoyaktuk
 Atkinson Point
 Nicholson Peninsula
 Horton River
 Cape Parry
 Pearce Point
 Clinton Point
 Clifton Point
 Cape Young
 Bernard Harbour
 Lady Franklin Point
 Ross Point
 Byron Bay
 Cape Peel
 Cambridge Bay
 Sturt Point
 Jenny Lind Island
 Hat Island
 Gladman Point

 Matheson Point
 Shepherd Bay
 Simpson Lake
 Pelly Bay
 Keith Bay
 Mackar Inlet
 Scarpa Lake
 Hall Beach
 Rowley Island
 Bray Island
 Longstaff Bluff
 Nudluardjuk Lake
 Dewar Lakes
 Ekalugad
 Cape Hooper
 Kivitoo
 Broughton Island
 Durban Island
 Cape Dyer
 Brevoort Island
 Resolution Island

Mid-Canada Line radar stations

Alberta
 RCAF Station Stoney Mountain

British Columbia
 RCAF Station Dawson Creek

Manitoba

 RCAF Station Bird

 RCAF Station Cranberry Portage

Newfoundland and Labrador
 Border Beacon
 Hopedale Air Station

Ontario
 RCAF Station Winisk

Quebec

 RCAF Station Knob Lake

 RCAF Station Great Whale River

Pinetree Line radar stations

Alberta

 RCAF Station Beaverlodge
 RCAF Station Cold Lake

 RCAF Station Penhold

British Columbia

 RCAF Station Baldy Hughes
 RCAF Station Comox
 RCAF Station Holberg

 RCAF Station Kamloops
 RCAF Station Puntzi Mountain
 RCAF Station Tofino

Manitoba

 RCAF Station Beausejour

 RCAF Station Gypsumville

New Brunswick
 RCAF Station St. Margarets

Newfoundland & Labrador

 Cartwright Air Station
 Cape Makkovik Air Station
 Cut Throat Island Air Station
 Elliston Ridge Air Station
 Fox Harbour Air Station
 RCAF Station Gander
 RCAF Station Goose Bay
 Hopedale Air Station

 La Scie Air Station
 Melville Air Station
 Red Cliff Air Station
 RCAF Station Saglek
 Saint Anthony Air Station
 RCAF Station St. John's
 Spotted Island Air Station
 Stephenville Air Station

Nova Scotia

 RCAF Station Beaverbank
 RCAF Station Barrington

 RCAF Station Sydney

Northwest Territories

 RCAF Station Frobisher Bay

 RCAF Station Resolution Island

Ontario

 RCAF Station Armstrong
 RCAF Station Edgar
 RCAF Station Falconbridge
 RCAF Station Foymount

 RCAF Station Lowther
 RCAF Station Moosonee
 RCAF Station Pagwa
 RCAF Station Ramore
 RCAF Station Sioux Lookout

Quebec

 RCAF Station Chibougamau
 RCAF Station Moisie
 RCAF Station Mont Apica

 RCAF Station Lac St. Denis
 RCAF Station Parent
 RCAF Station Senneterre
 RCAF Station St. Sylvestre

Saskatchewan

 RCAF Station Alsask
 RCAF Station Dana

 R
AF Station Yorkton

Primary overseas stations

United Kingdom

 RCAF Langar
 RCAF Station North Luffenham

 RAF Odiham

France

 RCAF Station Marville
 RCAF Station Grostenquin

 RCAF Metz, France

Germany

 RCAF Station Baden-Soellingen
 RCAF Station Lahr
 CFS Ringsheim

 RCAF Station Zweibrücken

Afghanistan

Kandahar Air Base

British Commonwealth Air Training Plan relief airfields

 Relief airfield for No. 6 Service Flying Training School/RCAF Station Dunnville
 RCAF Detachment Gananoque

References

Canada
Stations
 
Canada,Air Force stations